Bitheca boleta is a species of lesser dung fly in the family Sphaeroceridae.

References

Sphaeroceridae
Articles created by Qbugbot
Insects described in 1987